Teleopsis is a genus of stalk-eyed flies in the family Diopsidae. All species in the genus are found in Asia. About 20 species are described  and several others as yet are to be described.

Species
T. adjacens Brunetti, 1928
T. africana (Shillito, 1940)
Teleopsis amnoni 
T. anjahanaribei (Vanschuytbroeck, 1965)
T. apographica (Séguy, 1949)
T. apollo Brunetti, 1928
T. bigoti Hendel, 1914 
T. boettcheri Frey, 1928 
T. breviscopium Rondani, 1875
T. cheni Yang & Chen, 1998 
T. cobiae Feijen, 2011
T. freyi Feijen, 2011
T. fulviventris Bigot, 1880
T. krombeini Feijen, 1998
T. longiscopium Rondani, 1875
T. maculata Feijen, 1998
T. motatrix Osten Sacken, 1882
T. nitidifacies Feijen, 2011
T. nitidiscutum Feijen, 2011
T. onopyxus Séguy, 1949
T. pallifacies Feijen & Feijen, 2011
T. pharao Frey, 1928
T. rubicunda Wulp, 1897
T. selecta Osten Sacken, 1882
T. sexguttata Brunetti, 1928
T. shillitoi Tenorio, 1969
T. sykesii (Westwood, 1837)
T. thaii Foldvari & Carr, 2007
T. trichophoras Meijere, 1916
T. vadoni (Vanschuytbroeck, 1965)
T. yunnana Yang & Chen, 1998

References

Diopsidae
Diopsoidea genera
Taxa named by Camillo Rondani